LCRD may stand for:

 Lake City Roller Dolls, roller derby league based in Warsaw, Indiana
 Laser Communication Relay Demonstration, NASA mission
 Lava City Roller Dolls, roller derby league based in Bend, Oregon